The appointment of federal judges for United States federal courts is done via nomination by the President of the United States and confirmation by the United States Senate. The tables below provide the composition of all Article III courts which include the Supreme Court and the Courts of Appeals at the end of each four year presidential term, as well as the current compositions of the District Courts and the Court of International Trade, categorizing the judges by the presidential term during which they were first appointed to their seats. 

As of June 30, 2022, of the 9 justices of the Supreme Court, 6 were appointed by a Republican president, and 3 were appointed by a Democratic president. 

As of February 14, 2023, of the 179 Courts of Appeals judges, 91 were appointed by Republican presidents, compared to 79 by Democratic presidents. Out of the 13 federal appeals courts, Democratic appointees have a majority on 7 courts, whereas Republican appointees have a majority on 5 courts, and 1 court is evenly split. 

As of February 14, 2023, of the 679 district court judges, 322 were appointed by Democratic presidents compared to 280 by Republican ones. Within the individual circuit jurisdictions, Democratic presidents have appointed majorities in 8 circuits while Republican presidents have appointed a majority in 4 circuits. 

The party of the president who appointed a judge is generally a consistent indicator of that judge's judicial philosophy and place on the political spectrum, especially in modern times, although there are cases where judges stray from their appointers. Federal judges often strategically time their retirement so as to give the president of the same party that first appointed them an opportunity to nominate the successor.

Acronym key

Supreme Court
The Supreme Court of the United States was established by the Constitution of the United States. Originally, the Judiciary Act of 1789 set the number of justices at six. However, as the nation's boundaries grew across the continent and as Supreme Court justices in those days had to ride the circuit, an arduous process requiring long travel on horseback or carriage over harsh terrain that resulted in months-long extended stays away from home, Congress added justices to correspond with the growth: seven in 1807, nine in 1837, and ten in 1863. The Judicial Circuits Act of 1866 then set the number to gradually be reduced to seven through the retirement or death of current associate justices. The court was down to eight when the Judiciary Act of 1869 restored the number to nine.

:

Courts of appeals
The United States courts of appeals were established by the Judiciary Act of 1891 as "United States circuit courts of appeals" (the name was changed to its current form in 1948). The act authorized 19 appellate judgeships in 9 circuits. Since then, the number of authorized appellate judgeships has increased to 179.

Summary of 13 circuits combined
:

 There were temporarily 178 appellate federal judgeships, due to the elimination of a 12th seat on the D.C. Circuit by Section 509 of the Court Security Improvement Act of 2007. That Act also provided for the creation of a 29th seat on the Ninth Circuit in January 2009 which increased the number of authorized appellate judgeships back to 179.

:

Partisan mix of the circuit courts
:

First Circuit
:

Second Circuit
:

Third Circuit
:

Fourth Circuit
:

 Roger Gregory, who was given a one-year recess appointment in Bill Clinton's second term and was subsequently given a lifetime appointment in George W. Bush's first term, is counted as a Clinton appointee on this page.

Fifth Circuit
:

 The 5th Circuit judges who were transferred to the 11th Circuit in 1981 are not included in the 5th Circuit numbers for 1980 for trend comparison purposes.

Sixth Circuit
:

Seventh Circuit
:

Eighth Circuit
:

Ninth Circuit
:

 SEC. 509. of the Court Security Improvement Act of 2007 provided for the creation of a 29th seat on the Ninth Circuit in January 2009.

Tenth Circuit
:

Eleventh Circuit
:

 The 11th Circuit was created in 1981. The judges that were transferred from the 5th Circuit to the 11th Circuit are shown in 1980 for trend comparison purposes.

D.C. Circuit
:

 SEC. 509. of the Court Security Improvement Act of 2007 eliminated the 12th seat on the D.C. Circuit.

Federal Circuit
:

 The Federal Circuit was created in 1982.  The judges from the courts that were combined into the Federal Circuit are shown in 1980 for trend comparison purposes.

District courts

Summary of 91 district courts
:

 Current (January 15, 2022) vacancies are 70 District judgeships/judges per uscourts.gov. 174 Trump-nominated District judges (177 judgeships, as one Trump nominee serves in two districts and one in three districts) were confirmed, of which 170 judges (173 judgeships) are currently serving. Four judges were subsequently elevated to Circuit Courts (Quattlebaum, Phipps, Brasher, Walker). (174+3-4=173)

 Congress has authorized 678 district judgeships including 674 Article III judgeships for the 50 States, the District of Columbia and Puerto Rico plus 4 Article IV judgeships for Guam, Northern Marianas, and the Virgin Islands. The 674 Article III judgeships include 664 permanent and 10 temporary judgeships. 

 However, the number of total authorized Article III District Judge positions is currently higher than 674 (679 in 2021) because four judges are authorized to serve a collective five additional judicial districts: one two-District (Trump-nominated) Judge in the Sixth, two two-District (one Clinton-nominated & one Obama-nominated) Judges in the Eighth and one three-district (Trump-nominated) Judge in the Tenth Circuit – see individual districts below for more details.

Partisan mix of the district courts

:

District courts in the First Circuit

:

District courts in the Second Circuit

:

District courts in the Third Circuit

:

District courts in the Fourth Circuit

:

District courts in the Fifth Circuit

:

District courts in the Sixth Circuit

:

Note: Judge Claria Horn Boom (Trump appointee) currently serves both the Eastern & Western Districts of Kentucky

District courts in the Seventh Circuit

:

District courts in the Eighth Circuit

:

Note: Currently there is a vacant seat that serves both the Eastern & Western Districts of Missouri. Judge Brian Wimes (Obama appointee) also currently serves in both the Eastern & Western Districts of Missouri.

District courts in the Ninth Circuit

:

District courts in the Tenth Circuit

:

Note: Judge John Heil III (Trump appointee) currently serves on the Eastern, Northern, & Western Districts of Oklahoma

District courts in the Eleventh Circuit

:

District court in the D.C. Circuit

:

United States Court of International Trade
The United States Court of International Trade is an Article III court, with full powers in law and equity, established by the Customs Court Act of 1980 to replace the United States Customs Court.

:

See also
United States federal judge
List of current United States circuit judges
List of current United States district judges
List of presidents of the United States by judicial appointments

References

External links
Ideological Voting on Federal Courts of Appeals
Summary of Judicial Vacancies
Biographical Directory of Article III Federal Judges, 1789-Present

Legal history of the United States
Nomination and appointment of United States federal judges